Elise Mertens and Demi Schuurs were the defending champions, but chose not to participate.

Monique Adamczak and Jessica Moore won the title, defeating in the final Danka Kovinić and Vera Lapko with the score 4–6, 7–5, [10–4].

Seeds

Draw

Draw

References
Main Draw

Guangzhou International Women's Open - Doubles
2018 Doubles